Jorge Miguel Soares Vieira (born 8 January 1991 in Massarelos) is a Portuguese footballer who plays for Norwegian club Fram as a goalkeeper.

External links

1991 births
Living people
Portuguese footballers
Association football goalkeepers
Segunda Divisão players
Boavista F.C. players
Padroense F.C. players
Gondomar S.C. players
Cypriot First Division players
Cypriot Second Division players
Doxa Katokopias FC players
AEK Kouklia F.C. players
Anagennisi Deryneia FC players
Karmiotissa FC players
FK Ørn-Horten players
Mjøndalen IF players
Egersunds IK players
IF Fram Larvik players
Portuguese expatriate footballers
Expatriate footballers in Cyprus
Expatriate footballers in Norway
Portuguese expatriate sportspeople in Cyprus
Portuguese expatriate sportspeople in Norway